St Nicholas School may refer to:
Saint Nicholas School, Essex, England
St. Nicholas Grammar School, Middlesex, England
Saint Nicholas High School, Bangladesh
CHIJ Saint Nicholas Girls' School, Ang Mo Kio, Singapore

See also
St Nicholas Catholic High School
St. Nicholas of Tolentine High School
St Nicholas' School, Hampshire, England
St. Nicholas' Primary School (disambiguation)
St. Nicholas High School (Houston, Texas), closed in 1967